John of Rouen may refer to
John of Avranches, Archbishop of Rouen from 1067 to 1079 
Jean de Rouen (Joao de Ruao), a French sculptor responsible for works in the Old Cathedral of Coimbra and elsewhere